Quiet Nights is a studio album by jazz musician Miles Davis, and his fourth album collaboration with Gil Evans, released in 1963 on Columbia Records, catalogue CL 2106 and CS 8906 in stereo. Recorded mostly at Columbia's 30th Street Studios in Manhattan, it is the final album by Davis and Evans.

Background
Keeping to his standard procedure at Columbia to date of alternating small group records and big band studio projects with Gil Evans, Davis entered the studio with Evans to follow up the latest studio LP by the working quintet, Someday My Prince Will Come. In 1961, Davis had also released his first live albums, two independent LPs entitled Friday Night at the Blackhawk and Saturday Night at the Blackhawk, in addition to the studio set. Another live set from 1961, Miles Davis at Carnegie Hall, also with both the quintet and a large ensemble conducted by Evans was issued in 1962.

The genesis of this Davis/Evans album, however, encountered far greater difficulties than its three predecessors. Bossa nova had recently become a commercial success in 1962 with the single "Desafinado" from the album Jazz Samba by Stan Getz, and Columbia executives may have pressured Davis and Evans to attempt something similar with this album. Sessions were also protracted over long stretches of time.

Recording
Two songs were recorded at the first session in July, "Corcovado" and "Aos Pés da Cruz" (the first refers to a famous sight in Brazil and the second means 'At the Foot of the Cross' in Portuguese), and released as Columbia singles 4-33059 and 4-4-42583; neither charted. The pair returned to longer forms for the subsequent sessions, Evans perhaps not given enough time to finish the charts for the earlier session. The attempt to mix potential hit singles and Evans' writing style for Davis, essentially concertos for jazz trumpeter, may have torpedoed the project.

After three sessions spread over four months, the yield was approximately 20 minutes of usable music, enough for an album side but not an entire album. Evans and Davis never made it back into the studio to complete more recordings, and the project was shelved. Faced with the expenses from the large ensemble and the studio time, producer Teo Macero added a quartet track from an April 1963 session in Hollywood to complete the album and give the label something to show for its investment, Quiet Nights, released two years after the start of recording. Davis was furious at the release of what he viewed as an unfinished project, and did not work with Macero again until the October 1966 sessions for Miles Smiles. The added tune, "Summer Night", was an outtake by Davis' group as recorded for the album Seven Steps to Heaven.

"Time of the Barracudas"—recorded in Hollywood on October 9 and 10, 1963—was written as a commission from Peter Barnes to accompany a production of his play of the same name starring Laurence Harvey and Elaine Stritch. It is unknown whether the music was actually used for its intended purpose. The song was included as a bonus track when the album was reissued on CD by Legacy Records on September 23, 1997.

Critical reception 

In a contemporary review for Down Beat, Leonard Feather called Quiet Nights a "curious and not entirely satisfying album". He felt "Song No. 2" ended prematurely while the long-meter arrangement of "Wait Till You See Her" sounded unusual, but found "Once Upon a Summertime" to be brilliantly recorded and "Summer Night" highlighted by Davis and Feldman's "consistent level of lyrical beauty". In the Saturday Review, Quiet Nights received praise for Davis' "wonderfully songful trumpet in a Latin-American vein", set against "piercingly lustrous curtains of tone and discreet Caribbean rhythms". Loren Schoenberg later called it "a slightly flawed but worthy companion" to other classic Davis-Evans recordings. J. D. Considine was less receptive in The Rolling Stone Album Guide (1992), dismissing the record as "halfhearted" bossa nova atypical from their otherwise exceptional work together.

Track listing

 Sides one and two were combined as tracks 1–7 on CD reissues.

Personnel
 Miles Davis – trumpet
 Gil Evans – arranger, conductor
 Shorty Baker, Bernie Glow, Louis Mucci, Ernie Royal – trumpets
 J.J. Johnson, Frank Rehak – trombones
 Ray Alonge, Don Corrado, Julius Watkins – french horns
 Bill Barber – tuba
 Steve Lacy – soprano saxophone
 Albert Block – flute
 Ray Beckenstein, Jerome Richardson – woodwinds
 Garvin Bushell, Bob Tricarico – bassoons
 Janet Putnam – harp
 Paul Chambers – bass
 Jimmy Cobb – drums
 Willie Bobo – bongos
 Elvin Jones – percussion

 Miles Davis Quintet on "Summer Night" only
 Miles Davis – trumpet
 George Coleman – tenor saxophone
 Victor Feldman – piano
 Ron Carter – bass
 Frank Butler – drums

 Orchestra on 1997 bonus track "Time of the Barracudas"
 Miles Davis – trumpet
 Gil Evans – arranger, conductor
 Dick Lieb – bass trombone
 Bill Hinshaw, Art Maeba, Richard Perissi – french horns
 Gene Cipriano, Buddy Collette, Paul Horn – woodwinds
 Fred Dutton – bassoon
 Marjorie Call – harp
 Herbie Hancock – piano
 Ron Carter – bass
 Tony Williams – drums

 Production
 Teo Macero – producer
 Irving Townsend – producer on "Time of the Barracudas"
 Fred Plaut – engineer
 Bob Belden – reissue producer and liner notes
 Phil Schaap, Mark Wilder – digital remastering engineer
 Seth Rothstein – reissue project coordinator
 Howard Fritzson – reissue art direction
 Dan Hunstein – photography

See also 

 1960s in jazz
 Orchestral jazz

References

External links 
 

Miles Davis albums
Gil Evans albums
1963 albums
Columbia Records albums
Albums produced by Teo Macero
Albums produced by Irving Townsend
Bossa nova albums
Albums recorded at CBS 30th Street Studio
Albums conducted by Gil Evans
Albums arranged by Gil Evans